Lucian Michael Freud  (8 December 1922 – 20 July 2011) was a British painter and draughtsman, specialising in figurative art, and is known as one of the foremost 20th-century English portraitists. He was born in Berlin, the son of Jewish architect Ernst L. Freud and the grandson of Sigmund Freud. Freud got his first name "Lucian" from his mother in memory of the ancient writer Lucian of Samosata. His family moved to England in 1933, when he was 10 years old, to escape the rise of Nazism. He became a British naturalized citizen in 1939. From 1942 to 1943 he attended Goldsmiths College, London. He served at sea with the British Merchant Navy during the Second World War.

His early career as a painter was influenced by surrealism, but by the early 1950s his often stark and alienated paintings tended towards realism. Freud was an intensely private and guarded man, and his paintings, completed over a 60-year career, are mostly of friends and family. They are generally sombre and thickly impastoed, often set in unsettling interiors and urban landscapes. The works are noted for their psychological penetration and often discomforting examination of the relationship between artist and model. Freud worked from life studies, and was known for asking for extended and punishing sittings from his models.

Early life and family
Born in Berlin, Freud was the son of a German Jewish mother, Lucie (née Brasch), and an Austrian Jewish father, Ernst L. Freud, an architect who was the fourth child of Austrian psychoanalyst Sigmund Freud. Lucian, the second of their three boys, was the elder brother of the broadcaster, writer and politician Clement Freud (thus uncle of Emma and Matthew Freud) and the younger brother of Stephan Gabriel Freud.

The family emigrated to St John's Wood, London, in 1933 to escape the rise of Nazism. Lucian became a British subject in 1939, having attended Dartington Hall School in Totnes, Devon, and later Bryanston School, for a year before being expelled owing to disruptive behaviour.

Early career
Freud briefly studied at the Central School of Art in London, and from 1939 to 1942 with greater success at Cedric Morris' East Anglian School of Painting and Drawing in Dedham, relocated in 1940 to Benton End, a house near Hadleigh, Suffolk. He also attended Goldsmiths' College, part of the University of London, in 1942–43. He served as a merchant seaman in an Atlantic convoy in 1941 before being invalided out of service in 1942.

In 1943, the poet and editor Meary James Thurairajah Tambimuttu commissioned the young artist to illustrate a book of poems by Nicholas Moore entitled The Glass Tower. It was published the following year by Editions Poetry London and comprised, among other drawings, a stuffed zebra and a palm tree. Both subjects reappeared in The Painter's Room on display at Freud's first solo exhibition in 1944 at the Lefevre Gallery. In the summer of 1946, he travelled to Paris before continuing to Greece for several months to visit John Craxton. In the early fifties he was a frequent visitor to Dublin where he would share Patrick Swift's studio. He remained a Londoner for the rest of his life.

Freud was one of a number of figurative artists who were later characterised by artist R. B. Kitaj as a group named the "School of London". This group was a loose collection of individual artists who knew each other, some intimately, and were working in London at the same time in the figurative style. The group was active contemporaneously with the boom years of abstract painting and in contrast to abstract expressionism. Major figures in the group included Freud, Kitaj, Francis Bacon, Frank Auerbach, Michael Andrews, Leon Kossoff, Robert Colquhoun, Robert MacBryde, and Reginald Gray. Freud was a visiting tutor at the Slade School of Fine Art of University College London from 1949 to 1954.

Mature style

Freud's early paintings, which are mostly very small, are often associated with German Expressionism (an influence he tended to deny) and Surrealism in depicting people, plants and animals in unusual juxtapositions. Some very early works anticipate the varied flesh tones of his mature style, for example Cedric Morris (1940, National Museum of Wales), but after the end of the war he developed a thinly painted very precise linear style with muted colours, best known in his self-portrait Man with a Thistle (1946, Tate) and a series of large-eyed portraits of his first wife, Kitty Garman, such as Girl with a Kitten (1947, Tate). These were painted with tiny sable brushes and evoke Early Netherlandish painting.

From the 1950s, he began to focus on portraiture, often nudes (though his first full-length nude was not painted until 1966), to the almost complete exclusion of everything else, and by the middle of the decade developed a much more free style using large hog's-hair brushes, concentrating on the texture and colour of flesh, and much thicker paint, including impasto. Girl with a White Dog, 1951–1952, (Tate) is an example of a transitional work in this process, sharing many characteristics with paintings before and after it, with relatively tight brushwork and a middling size and viewpoint. He would often clean his brush after each stroke when painting flesh, so that the colour remained constantly variable. He also started to paint standing up, which continued until old age, when he switched to a high chair. The colours of non-flesh areas in these paintings are typically muted, while the flesh becomes increasingly highly and variably coloured. By about 1960, Freud had established the style that he would use, with some changes, for the rest of his career. The later portraits often use an over life-size scale, but are of mostly relatively small heads or in half-lengths. Later portraits are often much larger. In his late career he often followed a portrait by producing an etching of the subject in a different pose, drawing directly onto the plate, with the sitter in his view.

Freud's portraits often depict only the sitter, sometimes sprawled naked on the floor or on a bed or alternatively juxtaposed with something else, as in Girl With a White Dog (1951–52) and Naked Man With Rat (1977–78). According to Edward Chaney, "The distinctive, recumbent manner in which Freud poses so many of his sitters suggests the conscious or unconscious influence both of his grandfather's psychoanalytical couch and of the Egyptian mummy, his dreaming figures, clothed or nude, staring into space until (if ever) brought back to health and/or consciousness. The particular application of this supine pose to freaks, friends, wives, mistresses, dogs, daughters and mother alike (the latter regularly depicted after her suicide attempt and eventually, literally mummy-like in death), tends to support this hypothesis."

The use of animals in his compositions is widespread, and often he features a pet and its owner. Other examples of portraits with both animals and people in Freud's work include Guy and Speck (1980–81), Eli and David (2005–06) and Double Portrait (1985–86). He had a special passion for horses, having enjoyed riding at school in Dartington, where he sometimes slept in the stables. His portraits solely of horses include Grey Gelding (2003), Skewbald Mare (2004), and Mare Eating Hay (2006). Wilting houseplants feature prominently in some portraits, especially in the 1960s, and Freud also produced a number of paintings purely of plants. Other regular features included mattresses in earlier works, and huge piles of the linen rags with which he used to clean his brushes in later ones. Some portraits, especially in the 1980s, have very carefully painted views of London roofscapes seen through the studio windows.

Freud's subjects, who needed to make a very large and uncertain commitment of their time, were often the people in his life; friends, family, fellow painters, lovers, children. He said, "The subject matter is autobiographical, it's all to do with hope and memory and sensuality and involvement, really." However the titles were mostly anonymous, and the identity of the sitter not always disclosed; the Duke and Duchess of Devonshire had a portrait of one of Freud's daughters as a baby for several years before he mentioned who the model was. In the 1970s Freud spent 4,000 hours on a series of paintings of his mother, about which art historian Lawrence Gowing observed "it is more than 300 years since a painter showed as directly and as visually his relationship with his mother. And that was Rembrandt."

Freud painted from life, and usually spent a great deal of time with each subject, demanding the model's presence even while working on the background of the portrait. Ria, Naked Portrait 2007, a nude completed in 2007, required sixteen months of work, with the model, Ria Kirby, posing all but four evenings during that time. With each session averaging five hours, the painting took approximately 2,400 hours to complete. A rapport with his models was necessary, and while at work, Freud was characterised as "an outstanding raconteur and mimic". Regarding the difficulty in deciding when a painting is completed, Freud said that "he feels he's finished when he gets the impression he's working on somebody else's painting". Paintings were divided into day paintings done in natural light and night paintings done under artificial light, and the sessions, and lighting, were never mixed.

It was Freud's practice to begin a painting by first drawing in charcoal on the canvas. He then applied paint to a small area of the canvas, and gradually worked outward from that point. For a new sitter, he often started with the head as a means of "getting to know" the person, then painted the rest of the figure, eventually returning to the head as his comprehension of the model deepened. A section of canvas was intentionally left bare until the painting was finished. The finished painting is an accumulation of richly worked layers of pigment, as well as months of intense observation.

Later career

Freud painted fellow artists, including Frank Auerbach and Francis Bacon and produced a large number of portraits of the performance artist Leigh Bowery. He also painted Henrietta Moraes, a muse to many Soho artists. A series of huge nude portraits from the mid-1990s depicted Sue Tilley, or "Big Sue", some using her job title of "Benefits Supervisor" in the title of the painting, as in his 1995 portrait Benefits Supervisor Sleeping, which in May 2008 was sold by Christie's in New York for $33.6 million, setting a world record auction price for a living artist.

Freud's most consistent model in his later years was his studio assistant and friend David Dawson, the subject of his final, unfinished work. Towards the end of his life he did a nude portrait of model Kate Moss. Freud was one of the best known British artists working in a representational style, and was shortlisted for the Turner Prize in 1989.

His painting After Cézanne, noteworthy because of its unusual shape, was purchased by the National Gallery of Australia for $7.4 million. The top left section of this painting has been 'grafted' on to the main section below, and closer inspection reveals a horizontal line where these two sections were joined.

In 1996, the Abbot Hall Art Gallery in Kendal mounted a major exhibition of 27 paintings and thirteen etchings, covering Freud's output to date. The following year the Scottish National Gallery of Modern Art presented "Lucian Freud: Early Works". The exhibition comprised around 30 drawings and paintings done between 1940 and 1945. In 1997 Freud received the Rubens Prize of the city of Siegen. From September 2000 to March 2001, the Museum für Moderne Kunst Frankfurt was able to show 50 paintings, drawings and etchings from the late 1940s to 2000 in a larger overview exhibition despite the artist's considerable resentment towards Germany. All print media bore the motif of Freud's outstanding painting Sleeping by the Lion Carpet (1995-1996) depicting the nude Sue Tilley. In addition to some of his most important nude portraits of women, the large-format picture Nude with leg up (Leigh Bowery) from 1992 was also shown in Frankfurt, which was removed in the Metropolitan Museum New York from the exhibition in 1993. The Frankfurt exhibition was realised in a personal dialogue between curator Rolf Lauter and Lucian Freud and is thus the only project Freud authorised in direct cooperation with a German museum. The major retrospective at London's Hayward Gallery in 1988 was the focal point for the BBC Omnibus programme which saw one of the very few conversations with Freud ever recorded, in this case with Omnibus director Jake Auerbach. The conversations with the artist were made possible by Duncan MacGuigan from Acquavella Galleries New York. This was followed by a large retrospective at Tate Britain in 2002. In 2001, Freud completed a portrait of Queen Elizabeth II. There was criticism of the portrayal in some sections of the British media. In 2005, a retrospective of Freud's work was held at the Museo Correr in Venice scheduled to coincide with the Biennale. In late 2007, a collection of etchings went on display at the Museum of Modern Art.

Freud died in London on 20 July 2011 and is buried in Highgate Cemetery. Archbishop Rowan Williams officiated at the private funeral.

Art market
In 2008 Benefits Supervisor Sleeping (1995), a portrait of civil servant Sue Tilley, sold for $33.6 million – the highest price ever at the time for a work by a living artist. At a Christie's New York auction in 2015, Benefits Supervisor Resting sold for $56.2 million.
On 13 October 2011, his 1952 Boy's Head, a small portrait of Charlie Lumley, his neighbour, reached $4,998,088 at Sotheby's London contemporary art evening auction, making it one of the highlights of the 2011 auction autumn season.

On 10 November 2015 Freud's 2004 painting The Brigadier, a portrait of Andrew Parker Bowles in his British Royal Army uniform, sold for $34.89 million US at Christie's in New York City, beating the $30 million US presale estimate for the work.

Personal life
In the 1940s Freud and fellow artists Adrian Ryan and John Minton were in a homosexual love triangle. After an affair with Lorna Garman, he went on to marry, in 1948, her niece Kitty Garman, daughter of sculptor Jacob Epstein and socialite Kathleen Garman. They had two daughters, Annabel Freud and the poet Annie Freud, before their marriage ended in 1952. Kitty Freud, later known as Kitty Godley (after her marriage in 1955 to economist Wynne Godley), died in 2011.

In late 1952, Freud eloped with Guinness heiress and writer Lady Caroline Blackwood to Paris, where they married in 1953; they divorced in 1959.

Freud is rumoured to have fathered as many as forty children although this number is generally accepted as an exaggeration. Fourteen children have been identified, two from Freud's first marriage and 12 by various mistresses. Writer Esther Freud and fashion designer Bella Freud are his daughters by Bernadine Coverley.

Selected solo exhibitions

 1994: Metropolitan Museum of Art, New York
 2000: Museum für Moderne Kunst, Frankfurt
 2003: Museum of Contemporary Art, Los Angeles
 2004: Scottish National Gallery, Edinburgh
 2005: Museo Correr, Venice
 2006: Acquavella Galleries, New York
 2007: Irish Museum of Modern Art, Dublin
 2008: Museum of Modern Art, New York
 2008: Gemeentemuseum Den Haag, The Hague
 2010: Centre Georges Pompidou, Paris
 2012: National Portrait Gallery, London
 2012: The Modern, Fort Worth
 2013: Kunsthistorisches Museum, Wien
 2016–2021: Irish Museum of Modern Art, Dublin
 2019: Royal Academy of Arts
 2022: National Gallery, London

References

Further reading

  
Lauter, Rolf (2000), Lucian Freud: Naked Portraits. Works from the 1940s to the 1990s, Museum für Moderne Kunst, Frankfurt am Main, 29.09.2000-04.03.2001.  
  
  
 
  
  
  
  
  
 "NPG", National Portrait Gallery, Exhibition booklet for Lucian Freud Portraits, 2012

External links

Lucian Freud exhibition (English), Press release/exhibition booklet, Kunsthistorisches Museum Wien, Vienna, 2014
 2002 exhibition at Tate Britain including a room guide
 Freud at Tate Britain
 Essay by Kelly Grovier on Lucian Freud in The Observer 2006
 Charles Finch on Lucian Freud – MoMA: Museum of Modern Art, New York City
  Lucian Freud – Centre Pompidou, Paris
 Lucian Freud: L'Atelier (The Studio) / Centre Pompidou, Paris Video 2010
 
 Channel Four News Interview with Lucian Freud on the campaign to keep Titian paintings in Britain 2008
 Lucian Freud from another perspective. A major exhibition coming to Madrid (2023)

British contemporary artists
Modern painters
Modern printmakers
1922 births
2011 deaths
Academics of the Slade School of Fine Art
People educated at Dartington Hall School
Alumni of Goldsmiths, University of London
Alumni of the Central School of Art and Design
British illustrators
British Merchant Navy personnel of World War II
British people of Austrian-Jewish descent
Fellows of the American Academy of Arts and Sciences
Lucian
Jewish painters
Jewish emigrants from Nazi Germany to the United Kingdom
Members of the Order of Merit
Members of the Order of the Companions of Honour
People from Berlin
People educated at Bryanston School
20th-century British painters
British male painters
21st-century British painters
20th-century British printmakers
German people of Austrian-Jewish descent
Naturalised citizens of the United Kingdom
Burials at Highgate Cemetery